Liadagmis Povea Rodríguez (born 6 February 1996) is a Cuban athlete who specialises in the triple jump. In 2014, she won silver medal at the World Junior Championships. Povea qualified for the 2016 Rio Olympics. She competed at the 2020 Tokyo Olympics.

Personal bests

International competitions

References

External links
 

1996 births
Living people
Cuban female triple jumpers
Athletes (track and field) at the 2016 Summer Olympics
Olympic athletes of Cuba
Competitors at the 2018 Central American and Caribbean Games
Central American and Caribbean Games bronze medalists for Cuba
Athletes (track and field) at the 2019 Pan American Games
Pan American Games bronze medalists for Cuba
Pan American Games medalists in athletics (track and field)
Central American and Caribbean Games medalists in athletics
Medalists at the 2019 Pan American Games
Athletes (track and field) at the 2020 Summer Olympics